Sir Alexander West Russell (1879–1961) was Conservative MP for Tynemouth from 1922 to 1945.

References

External links 
 

Conservative Party (UK) MPs for English constituencies
1879 births
1961 deaths
UK MPs 1922–1923
UK MPs 1924–1929
UK MPs 1929–1931
UK MPs 1931–1935
UK MPs 1935–1945